Nunn may refer to:

 Nunn (surname)
 Alan Nunn May (1911–2003), English physicist
 Nunn, Colorado, United States
 Nunn (crater), a lunar impact crater

See also
 None (disambiguation)
 Nun (disambiguation)